Żmiąca  is a village in the administrative district of Gmina Laskowa, within Limanowa County, Lesser Poland Voivodeship, in southern Poland.

The village has a population of 704.

References

Villages in Limanowa County